Gautam Raghuwanshi (born 3 July 1991) is an Indian cricketer. He made his first-class debut on 3 January 2020, for Madhya Pradesh in the 2019–20 Ranji Trophy.

References

External links
 

1991 births
Living people
Indian cricketers
Madhya Pradesh cricketers
Place of birth missing (living people)